The Loomis Chaffee School (LC or Loomis) is a selective independent, coeducational, college preparatory school for boarding and day students in grades 9–12, including postgraduate students, located in Windsor, Connecticut, seven miles north of Hartford. Seventy percent of Loomis Chaffee's 726 students reside on the school's 300-acre campus and represent forty-four foreign countries and thirty-one U.S. states. 71% of Loomis Chaffee's student body are boarding students while 29% of Loomis Chaffee's student body are day students. 

Founded in 1914, Loomis Chaffee is a member of the Ten Schools Admissions Organization along with Choate, Andover, Exeter, Deerfield, St. Paul's, Hotchkiss, Lawrenceville, Taft, and The Hill School. Loomis had an acceptance rate of 18% for the 2021–2022 school year.

History 

The school was chartered in 1874 as The Loomis Institute by five Loomis siblings, who had outlived all their children. Stating that it was their hope that "some good may come to posterity, from the harvest, poor though it be, of our lives," the school was intended as a memorial to their deceased children and a gift to future children. The original 1640 Loomis Homestead was chosen as the site for The Loomis Institute, which opened in 1914. The forty-year gap between chartering and the opening of the school was due to the estate of the Loomis siblings being reserved for the siblings' retirement.

In 1910, John Mason Loomis's wife left over $1.1 million as an endowment to The Loomis Institute for charitable purposes. This donation allowed the school to remain tuition-free for its first four decades. In addition to being tuition-free, The Loomis Institute was distinguished from other New England preparatory schools by its lack of religious affiliation, offering of vocational education alongside college preparatory courses, and admission of both boys and girls.

The Loomis Institute ended coeducation in 1926 when The Chaffee School was incorporated to educate girls on an adjacent campus. In 1970, the boys and girls schools merged to form The Loomis Chaffee School. Since then, the school has expanded as its endowment, financial aid budget, faculty, and campus increased in size.

Overview

Academics
Loomis Chaffee offers courses in Arabic, Chinese, psychology, writing workshop, videography, English, Latin, Spanish, French, art, dance, history and social science, mathematics, music, philosophy, religion, science and theater arts. Noncredit diploma requirements include library skills, and physical fitness and health. Advanced Placement courses are offered in 20 subjects. The Norton Family Center for the Common Good and the Alvord Center for Global & Environmental Studies work to engage the student body with the wider community and world by means of visiting speakers and international study opportunities.

College guidance
Five full-time college counselors guide students through the college search and application process. Eighty-six percent of the members of the Class of 2010 were admitted to colleges and universities deemed most competitive or highly competitive by Barron's Profiles of American Colleges, with sixty-six percent matriculating at the most competitive institutions.

Athletics
Loomis Chaffee competes in sports against schools from all over New England and adjacent states. The school is a member of the New England Preparatory School Athletic Council (NEPSAC) and competes in the Class A large school division. Additionally, Loomis is a member of The Founders League which comprises private schools located mainly in Connecticut.

Fall
 Football (Varsity, JV)
 Boys' soccer (Varsity, JV, III)
 Girls' soccer (Varsity, JV, III)
 Boys' cross country
 Girls' cross country
 Field hockey (Varsity, JV)
 Girls' volleyball (Varsity, JV)
 Boys' water polo (Varsity, JV)
  Co-ed Equestrian

Winter
 Boys' basketball (Varsity, JV)
 Girls' basketball (Varsity, JV)
 Boys' ice hockey (Varsity, JV)
 Girls' ice hockey (Varsity, JV)
 Boys' squash (Varsity, JV)
 Girls' squash (Varsity, JV)
 Boys' swimming/diving (Varsity)
 Girls' swimming/diving (Varsity)
  Co-ed Equestrian
  Co-ed Skiing (Varsity)

Spring
 Baseball (Varsity, JV)
 Softball (Varsity)
 Boys' tennis (Varsity, JV)
 Girls' tennis (Varsity, JV)
 Boys' golf (Varsity, JV)
 Girls' golf (Varsity)
 Boys' track and field
 Girls' track and field
 Boys' lacrosse (Varsity, JV, III)
 Girls' lacrosse (Varsity, JV)
 Girls' water polo (Varsity)

Student Publications

The Loomis Chaffee Log
The Loomis Chaffee Log is a student-run, school-sponsored newspaper. Established in 1915, the Log is published monthly by a team of student editors. In 2015, the Log editorial staff launched an online edition.

The Hourglass and World Bulletin 
The Hourglass and World Bulletin are two student-run publications. The Hourglass strives to inform the Loomis Chaffee Community of global news and their connection to the past through discussions and tri-quarterly publications where students feel informed, heard, and acknowledged. Founded in 2011, the World Bulletin is the Loomis Chaffee School's scholarly journal on contemporary politics and international relations.

Heads of school

 (1914-1949): Nathaniel Horton Batchelder
 (1949-1952): William Speer
 (1952-1967): Francis Olmsted Grubbs
 (1967-1976): Frederick G. Torrey
 (1976-1996): John Ratté
 (1996-2008): Russell H. Weigel
 (2008–present): Sheila Culbert

Notable alumni

See also
 John Mason Loomis — American lumber tycoon and Union colonel during the American Civil War, and one of the Loomis family financiers and co-founders of the Loomis Institute
 James Chaffee Loomis - American lawyer, politician, and co-founder of the Loomis Institute
 Osbert Burr Loomis - American portrait painter and co-founder of the Loomis Institute

References

External links

 

Boarding schools in Connecticut
Educational institutions established in 1914
Preparatory schools in Connecticut
Private high schools in Connecticut
Schools in Hartford County, Connecticut
Windsor, Connecticut
1914 establishments in Connecticut